Amadou-Amath M'Baye (born 14 December 1989) is a French professional basketball player for Anadolu Efes of the Basketbol Süper Ligi (BSL) and EuroLeague.

Career
In the first two years as an NCAA men's basketball player, Amath M'Baye was in Wyoming. He averaged 12 points and 5.7 rebounds in 31 games. For that reason he received the individual award "All-MWC Honorable Mention". He later transferred to the Oklahoma Sooners where he played in the 2012–13 season (after sitting out one year, per NCAA transfer rules), having an average of 10.1 points and 5.1 rebounds per game. He was in the third-best quintet of the "All-Big12" and later in the best quintet of the "Big12 All-rookie".

M'Baye started his professional career in Japan with the Mitsubishi Diamond Dolphins for three seasons, from 2013 to 2016. During these three years, he averaged 20.2 points, 7.7 rebounds and 2.5 assists. During the 2014–15 season, he won the MVP award at the Japan All-Star Game and he was in the best quintet of the local league.

As a young player, Amath M'Baye was selected up for the 2009 FIBA Europe Under-20 Championship in Greece with the French national basketball team, winning the silver medal.

In 2016, the French player signed a contract with the Italian basketball team New Basket Brindisi, and he will take part to the 2016–17 LBA season.

On 26 July 2019 he has signed a contract with Pınar Karşıyaka of the Turkish Basketbol Süper Ligi. M'Baye averaged 11.7 points, 3.6 rebounds and 2.8 assists per game during the 2019–2020 season. On July 3, 2020, he re-signed with the team. M'Baye averaged 16.1 points, 3.7 rebounds, and 1.8 assists per game. He re-signed with Pınar Karşıyaka on August 10, 2021.He signed with Anadolu Efes on June 30, 2022.

On June 2, 2022, he has signed with Anadolu Efes of the Basketbol Süper Ligi (BSL).

Honours and titles

Club
Olimpia Milano
Lega Basket Serie A: 2017–18
Italian Supercup: 2017
Virtus Bologna
Basketball Champions League: 2018–19

International
Italy Under-20
European U20 Championship: 2009 Greece

Individual
All-Champions League Second Team: 2018–19
NBL Best Quintet: 2014–15
NBL All-Star Game MVP: 2015

References

External links

Lega Basket Serie A profile 
FIBA Archive profile 
Eurobasket.com profile
New Basket Brindisi profile
TBLStat.net Profile

1989 births
Living people
2019 FIBA Basketball World Cup players
Anadolu Efes S.K. players
French expatriate basketball people in Italy
French expatriate basketball people in Japan
French expatriate basketball people in Turkey
French expatriate basketball people in the United States
French sportspeople of Senegalese descent
French men's basketball players
Karşıyaka basketball players
Lega Basket Serie A players
Nagoya Diamond Dolphins players
New Basket Brindisi players
Oklahoma Sooners men's basketball players
Olimpia Milano players
Power forwards (basketball)
Sportspeople from Bordeaux
Virtus Bologna players
Wyoming Cowboys basketball players